Karl Gillingham (born February 6, 1965) is an American professional strongman and powerlifter.

Strongman career
Karl has been competing in strongman since 1998 and has consistently been ranked in the top five nationally almost every year he has competed. Karl's first contest in strongman was the 1998 America's Strongest Man, which he won. Since that time Karl has traveled the world competing in over 70 top national and international contests including the prestigious World's Strongest Man contest, the IFSA Strongman World Championships, the Arnold Strongman Classic and the Strongman Super Series.

Personal life
Karl is co-owner of Jackal's Gym in Marshall, Minnesota, an elite strength training gym and internet website along with brothers Brad and Wade.

Gillingham's father is Gale Gillingham, former guard for the Green Bay Packers in the National Football League. Karl is part of the "first family of strength" along with his father Gale, and brothers Wade and Brad Gillingham.

Strongman records
World Record for Atlas Stones - Schreveport, LA 2002 North America's Strongest Man

Powerlifting
Won MN State USAPL Championship 6 consecutive years: 93-98
USAPL #1 Deadlift in Nation in 125 Kilo Class -'97

Achievements 
Professional Competitive Record - [1st (14),2nd (9),3rd (9) - Out of Total(75)]

Performance Metric - .870  [American - .884  International - .816]

 North American Championship - Gatineau, Quebec - 5th place (2014))
 Strongman Challenge - Dubreuilville, Ontario - 6th place (2013))
 North American Championship - Gatineau, Quebec - 4th place (2013))
 Festival Hommes Forts - Warwick, Quebec - 5th place (2013)) 
 Masters Americans Strongest Man - Kokomo, IN - 2nd place (2013))
 North American Championship - Gatineau, Quebec - 7th place (2012))
 Sequim Irrigation Festival - Washington, USA - 2nd place (2012)
 North American Championship - Gatineau, Quebec - 3rd place (2011))
 Liberty Classic Strongman - Philadelphia, Pennsylvania, USA - 6th place (2011)
 Toronto Pro Expo - Toronto, Ontario - 7th place (2011)
 Strongman Showdown - Sequim Irrigation Festival, Washington, USA - 1st place (2011)
 USA vs Poland - Chicago, IL- 2nd place (2011)
 Santader Extremo Exhibition - Bucaramanga, Colombia - 1st place (2010)
 North American Championship - Gatineau, Quebec - 5th place (2010)
 Bogota Tractomulous Exhibition - Bogota, Colombia - (2010)
 Marunde Invitational - Sequim Irrigation Festival, Washington, USA - 2nd place (2010)
 All American Strongman Challenge - Ironman FitExpo - Los Angeles, California, USA - 9th place  (2010)
 North American Championship - Gatineau, Quebec - 4th place (2009)
 Strongman Bogota Summerfest - Bogota, Colombia - 2nd place (2009)
 Liberty Classic Strongman - Philadelphia, Pennsylvania, USA - 4th place (2009)
 Summerfest Strongman Exhibition - Bogota, Colombia - 1st place (2008)
 Globes Strongest Man - Moscow Grand Prix - Moscow, Russia - 6th place (2008)
 Marunde Invitational - Sequim Irrigation Festival, Washington, USA - 4th place (2008)
 USA vs Poland - Lodz, Poland - 2nd place (2008)
 Mohegan Sun Super Series Grand Prix - Mohegan Sun Resort, Connecticut, USA - 6th place (2008)
 World's Strongest Man - Anaheim, California, USA - 5th in heat (2007)
 Viking Challenge Super Series Grand Prix - Norway - 6th place (2007)
 Venice Beach Super Series Grand Prix - Venice Beach, California, USA - 4th place (2007)
 Arnold's Strongest Man - Columbus, Ohio, USA - 9th place (2007)
 All American Strongman Challenge - Ironman FitExpo - Pasadena, California, USA - 1st place  (2007)
 Xtreme Strongman Challenge - St. Louis, Missouri, USA - 2nd place (2006)
 Mohegan Sun Super Series Grand Prix - Mohegan Sun Resort, Connecticut, USA - 6th place (2006)
 IFSA World Championship - Quebec City, Quebec - 12th place (2005)
 IFSA Pan American Championship - São Paulo, Brazil - 3rd place (2005)
 IFSA Arnold's Strongest Man - Columbus, Ohio, USA - 8th place (2005)
 IFSA Sweden Super Series Grand Prix - Gothenburg, Sweden - 5th place (2004)
 IFSA USA Nationals - Atlanta, Georgia, USA - 3rd place (2004)
 IFSA World's Strongest Team - Plock, Poland - 6th place (2004)
 Kasson Open - Kasson, Minnesota, USA - 1st place  (2004)
 Children of the Corn Pro/Am Invitational - Northfield, MN USA - 1st place  (2004)
 IFSA World Cup - Riga, Latvia - injured (2004)
 Strongest Man Alive - Willmington, Delaware, USA - 3rd place (2004)
 IFSA St. Louis Fitness Festival - St. Louis, Missouri, USA - 4th place (2004)
 IFSA Ventura Strongman Challenge - Ventura, California, USA - injured (2003)
 IFSA Las Vegas Strongman Challenge - Las Vegas, Nevada, USA - 4th place (2003)
 IFSA Northeast Strongman Challenge - Boston, Massachusetts, USA - 3rd place (2003)
 Children of the Corn Pro/Am Invitational - Iowa University, IA USA - 1st place (2003)
 IFSA Hawaii Super Series Grand Prix - Honolulu, Hawaii, USA - 7th place (2003)
 IFSA Hawaii Super Series 2002 Finals - Honolulu, Hawaii, USA - 9th place (2003)
 GNC Show of Strength - New Orleans, Louisiana, USA - 3rd place (2002)
 North American Championships - Shreveport, Louisiana, USA - 2nd place (2002)
 World's Strongest Man - Kuala Lumpur, Malaysia - 3rd in heat (2002)
 Kasson Open - Kasson, Minnesota, USA - 1st place  (2002)
 IFSA USA Championships - St. Louis, Missouri, USA - 3rd place (2002)
 IFSA Ohio Valley Strongman Challenge - Athens, Ohio, USA - 5th place (2002)
 IFSA Midwest Strongman Challenge - Columbus, Ohio, USA - 5th place (2002)
 IFSA Northeast Strongman Challenge - Boston, Massachusetts, USA - 1st place  (2002)
 Children of the Corn Pro/Am Invitational - Iowa University, IA USA - 1st place  (2002)
 World's Strongest Man - Victoria Falls, Zambia - 4th in heat (2001)
 IFSA USA vs. World - St. Louis, Missouri, USA - 6th place (2001)
 NSAA Silicon Valley - Sunnyvale, California, USA - 3rd place (2001)
 NSAA Caribbean World Strongman - Dominican Republic - 6th place (2001)
 IFSA Hawaii Beauty & Beast - Honolulu, Hawaii, USA - 4th place (2001)
 Azeala Festival Pro Invitational - Norfolk, Virginia, USA - 2nd place (2001)
 Children of the Corn Pro/Am Invitational - Iowa University, IA USA - 1st place  (2001)
 NSAA Strongman Tour - Kansas City, Missouri, USA - 1st place  (2000)
 NSAA Strongman Tour - Holly, Michigan, USA - 1st place  (2000)
 NSAA Strongman Tour - Shakoppee, Minnesota, USA - 1st place  (2000)
 American Showdown - St. Louis, Missouri, USA - 8th place (2000)
 IFSA American Strongman Championship - Kokomo, Indiana, USA - 3rd place (2000)
 IFSA Hawaii Beauty and the Beast - Honolulu, Hawaii, USA - 6th place (2000)
 Strongman II - St. Louis, Missouri, USA - 8th place (1999)
 IFSA American Strongman Championship - Honolulu, Hawaii, USA - 6th place (1999)
 American Full Strength International Challenge - Las Vegas, Nevada, USA - 9th (1998)
 American Full Strength National Championship - Las Vegas, Nevada, USA - 1st place  (1998)

External links 
Official Jackal's Gym web site/online store

References 

American powerlifters
American strength athletes
1965 births
Living people